Depleted uranium hexafluoride (DUHF; also referred to as depleted uranium tails, depleted uranium tailings or DUF6) is a byproduct of the processing of uranium hexafluoride into enriched uranium. It is one of the chemical forms of depleted uranium (up to 73-75%), along with depleted triuranium octoxide (up to 25%) and depleted uranium metal (up to 2%). DUHF is 1.7 times less radioactive than uranium hexafluoride and natural uranium.

History 
The concept of depleted and enriched uranium emerged nearly 150 years after the discovery of uranium by Martin Klaproth in 1789. In 1938, two German physicists Otto Hahn and Fritz Strassmann had made the discovery of the fission of the atomic nucleus of the 235U  isotope, which was theoretically substantiated by Lise Meitner, Otto Robert Frisch and in parallel with them Gottfried von Droste and Siegfried Flügge. This discovery marked the beginning of the peaceful and military use of the intra-atomic energy of uranium. A year later, Yulii Khariton and Yakov Zeldovich were the first to prove theoretically that with an insignificant enrichment of natural uranium in the 235U isotope, it is possible to give the process a chain character, creating the necessary conditions for the continuous fission of atomic nuclei. The principle of a nuclear chain reaction implies that at least one neutron, during the decay of an atom of the isotope 235U, will be captured by another atom of 235U and, accordingly, will also cause its decay. In this process, the probability of such a “capture” plays a significant role. To increase this probability, a fractional increase in the 235U isotope is necessary, which in natural uranium constitutes only 0.72%, along with the primary 238U, which takes up 99.27% and 234U - 0.0055%, respectively. A small fraction of the 235U isotope content in natural uranium, when used as a primary fissile material in most areas of nuclear technology, necessitated enrichment of natural uranium in this isotope.

Over time, in the process of improving nuclear technologies, optimal technological and economic solutions were identified, requiring an increase in the 235U fraction, that is, uranium enrichment and, as a consequence of these processes, the appearance of an equivalent amount of depleted uranium with a 235U isotope content of less than 0.72%. The content of 235U in the depleted uranium formed during the enrichment process depends on the purpose of the enrichment.

Competition 

By the mid-1960s, the United States had a monopoly on the supply of uranium fuel for Western nuclear power plants. In 1968, the USSR declared its readiness to accept orders for uranium enrichment. As a result, a new competitive market began to form in the world, and new commercial enrichment companies began to appear (URENCO and Eurodif). In 1971, the first Soviet contract was signed with the French Alternative Energies and Atomic Energy Commission, where nuclear power plants were actively built. In 1973, roughly 10 long-term contracts were signed with power companies from Italy, Germany, Great Britain, Spain, Sweden, Finland, Belgium and Switzerland. By 2017, large commercial enrichment plants have been operating in France, Germany, the Netherlands, Great Britain, the United States, Russia and China. The development of the enrichment market has led to the accumulation of over 2 million tons of DUHF in the world during this period.

Terminology 

Since the discovery of uranium and its properties, some terms such as Q-metal, depletalloy, or D-38 have become obsolete, and new terms have replaced them. DUHF can be referred to as depleted uranium (DU), and likewise, depleted uranium is sometimes referred to as uranium hexafluoride (UF6). However, all three terms have significant differences between them, not only in their isotopic composition (that is DUHF being a product of the processed uranium hexafluoride), but also in the understanding of the whole and the constituent parts. Depleted uranium, as a whole concept, may exist in several chemical forms; in the form of DUHF, the most common form, with a density of 5.09 g/cm3, in the form of depleted triuranium octoxide with a density of 8.38 g/cm3, and in the form of depleted uranium metal with a density of 19.01 g/cm3.

Physical properties 

 	
The key distinction between uranium hexafluoride and DUHF, besides the isotopic composition, are the differences in their origin, as well as their further purpose and application. Uranium hexafluoride is an intermediate product that is artificially created by fluorination of uranium tetrafluoride with fluorine in the amounts necessary to produce enriched uranium. In contrast, DUHF is a residual product of conversion of uranium hexafluoride into enriched uranium. At the end of the 235U enrichment process, the initial uranium hexafluoride, with its natural isotopic composition (due to the natural uranium isotope ratio), is converted into two other products (with new isotope ratios of 235U, 238U and 234U) - enriched uranium and DUHF.

Due to the fact that the various uranium isotopes share the same chemical properties, the chemical and physical properties of depleted uranium hexafluoride and naturally occurring uranium hexafluoride substances, as well as enriched uranium, are identical, except for the degree of radioactivity. Depleted uranium hexafluoride, as the primary form of depleted uranium, can be converted to other forms of DU with a different density. Under standard conditions, DU appears as transparent or light gray crystals, with a density of 5.09 g/cm3. At temperatures below 64.1 °C and a pressure of 1.5 atm, the solid DUHF converts to a gaseous form and bypasses the liquid phase. The critical temperature of DUHF is 230.2 °C, and the critical pressure is 4.61 MPa.

Radioactivity 

The radioactivity of DUHF is determined by the isotopic composition of uranium and the ratio of its isotopes (234U, 235U and 238U), because the fluorine in the compound has only one stable isotope, 19F. The radioactive decay rate of natural uranium hexafluoride (with 0.72% of 235U) is 1.7×104 Bq/g and is determined by 238U and 234U isotopes by 97%.

 	
When uranium is enriched, the content of light isotopes, 234U and 235U, increases. Although 234U*, despite its much lower mass fraction, contributes more to the activity, the target isotope for nuclear industry use is 235U. Therefore, the degree of uranium enrichment or depletion is determined by the content of 235U. Depending on the 235U content below the natural level of 0.72%, the activity of the DUHF can be significantly lower than that of natural uranium hexafluoride. 

 	
*The values of radioactive decay rate include the activity of 234U, which is concentrated in the enrichment process, and do not include the contribution of daughter products.

Production 

Low enriched uranium (LEU) with enrichment of 2 to 5% 235U (with some exceptions when using 0.72% in natural composition, for example in Canadian CANDU reactors) is used for nuclear power, in contrast to weapons-grade highly enriched uranium with 235U content of over 20% and in some cases over 90%, which is achieved at the highest levels of enrichment. Various methods of isotope separation are used to produce enriched uranium, mainly centrifugation and, in the past, the gaseous diffusion method. Most of them work with gaseous uranium hexafluoride (UF6), which in turn is produced by fluorination of elemental fluoride tetrafluoride (UF4 + F2 → UF6) or uranium oxides (UO2F2 + 2 F2 → UF6 + O2), with great heat excretion in both cases. Since uranium hexafluoride is the only uranium compound that is gaseous at a relatively low temperature, it plays a key role in the nuclear fuel cycle as a substance suitable for separating isotopes 235U and 238U. After obtaining enriched uranium hexafluoride with a natural isotopic composition, the remainder (approximately 95% of the total mass) is transformed into depleted uranium hexafluoride (as a form of depleted uranium), which consists mainly of 238U, because its 235U content is much lower than 0.72% (depending on the enrichment degree) and there is virtually no 234U. In 2020, nearly two million tons of depleted uranium was accumulated in the world. Most of it is stored in the form of DUHF in special steel tanks.

The methods of handling depleted uranium in different countries depends on their nuclear fuel cycle strategy. The IAEA recognizes that policy determination is the prerogative of the government (para. VII of the Joint Convention on the Safety of Spent Fuel Management and on the Safety of Radioactive Waste Management). Given the technological capabilities and concepts of the nuclear fuel cycle in each country, with access to separation facilities, DUHF may be considered as a valuable raw material on one hand or low-level radioactive waste on the other. Therefore, there is no unified legal and regulatory status for DUHF in the world. The IAEA expert report , 2001 and the joint report of the OECD, NEA and IAEA Management of Depleted Uranium, 2001 recognize DUHF as a valuable raw material.

Applications 

As a result of chemical conversion of DUHF, anhydrous hydrogen fluoride and/or its aqueous solution (i.e. hydrofluoric acid) are obtained, which have a certain demand in non-nuclear energy markets, such as the aluminum industry, in production of refrigerants, herbicides, pharmaceuticals, high-octane gasoline, plastics, etc. It is also applied in the reuse of hydrogen fluoride in the production of uranium hexafluoride (UF6) via the conversion of triuranium octoxide (U3O8) into uranium tetrafluoride (UF4), before further fluorination into uranium hexafluoride (UF6).

Processing 

There are multiple directions in the world practice of DUHF reprocessing. Some of them have been tested in a semi-industrial setting, while others have been and are being operated on an industrial scale with an effort to reduce the reserves of uranium tailings and provide the chemical industry with hydrofluoric acid and industrial organofluorine products. 	

Depending on nuclear fuel cycle strategy, technological capabilities, international conventions and programs, such as the Sustainable Development Goals (SDG) and the UN Global Compact, each country approaches the issue of the use of accumulated depleted uranium individually. The United States has adopted a number of long-term programs for the safe storage and reprocessing of DUHF stocks prior to their final disposal.

Sustainable development goals 

Under the UN SDG, nuclear power plays a significant role not only in providing access to affordable, reliable, sustainable and modern energy (Goal 7), but also in contributing to other goals, including supporting poverty, hunger and water scarcity elimination, economic growth and industry innovation. A number of countries, such as the United States, France, Russia, and China, through their leading nuclear power operators, have committed to achieving the Sustainable Development Goals. To achieve these goals, various technologies are being applied both in the reprocessing of spent fuel and in the reprocessing of accumulated DUHF.

Transportation 
International policies for transporting radioactive materials are regulated by the International Atomic Energy Agency (IAEA) since 1961. These regulations are implemented in the policies of the International Civil Aviation Organization (ICAO), International Maritime Organization (IMO), and regional transport organizations.

Depleted uranium hexafluoride is transported and stored under standard conditions in solid form, and in sealed metal containers with wall thickness of about 1 cm (0.39 in), designed for extreme mechanical and corrosive impacts. For example, the most common "Y48" containers for transportation and storage contain up to 12.5 tons of DUHF in solid form. DUHF is loaded and unloaded from these containers under factory conditions when heated, in liquid form and via special autoclaves.

Dangers 

Due to its low radioactivity, the main health hazards of DUHF are connected to its chemical effects on bodily functions. Chemical exposure is a major hazard at facilities associated with the processing of DUHF. Uranium and fluoride compounds such as hydrogen fluoride (HF) are toxic at low levels of chemical exposure. When DUHF comes in contact with air moisture, it reacts to form HF and gaseous uranyl fluoride. HF is a corrosive acid that can be extremely dangerous if inhaled; it is one of the major work hazards in such industries.

In many countries, current occupational exposure limits for soluble uranium compounds are related to a maximum concentration of 3 µg of uranium per gram of kidney tissue. Any effects caused by exposure to these levels on the kidneys are considered minor and temporary. Current practices based on these limits provide adequate protection for workers in the uranium industry. To ensure that these kidney concentrations are not exceeded, legislation limits long-term (8 hours) concentrations of soluble uranium in workplace air to 0.2 mg per cubic meter and short-term (15 minutes) to 0.6 mg per cubic meter

Incidents during transportation 

In August 1984, the freighter MS Mont Louis sank in the English Channel with 30 full and 22 empty DUHF containers on board. The 30 containers (type 48-Y) of uranium hexafluoride were recovered, as well as 16 of the 22 empty containers (type 30-B). Examination of the 30 containers revealed, in one case, a small leak in the shutoff valve. There were 217 samples taken, subjected to 752 different analyses and 146 measurements of dose levels on the containers. There was no evidence of leakage of either radioactive (natural or recycled uranium) or physicochemical substances (fluorine or hydrofluoric acid). According to The Washington Post, this incident was not hazardous because the uranium cargo was in its natural state, with an isotope 235U content of 0.72% or less, and only some of it was enriched to 0.9%.

See also
 CANDU reactor, commercial power reactors that can use unenriched uranium fuel
 Traveling wave reactor - a reactor concept that uses depleted uranium for fuel

References

 
Element toxicology
Uranium, Depleted
Uranium